The USRA Heavy Santa Fe was a USRA standard class of steam locomotive designed under the control of the United States Railroad Administration, the nationalized railroad system in the United States during World War I.  These locomotives were of 2-10-2 wheel arrangement in the Whyte notation, or 1′E1′ in UIC classification; this arrangement was commonly named "Santa Fe" in the United States.  At the time, the Santa Fe was the largest non-articulated type in common use, primarily in slow drag freight duty in ore or coal service.

A total of 175 of these locomotives were constructed under the auspices of the USRA.  They went to the following railroads:

The Pennsylvania Railroad locomotives were later refitted with the Pennsy's trademark Belpaire fireboxes. None of the originals built under USRA auspices or any of the subsequent copies were preserved.

References

 
 {http://www.illinois-central.net/steam/1933Diagrams/1933LocomotiveDiagrams.html }

2-10-2 locomotives
USRA locomotives
ALCO locomotives
Baldwin locomotives
Freight locomotives
Standard gauge locomotives of the United States
Scrapped locomotives 
Railway locomotives introduced in 1918